Skyfire is an Indian sci-fi TV series, directed by Soumik Sen. The series is produced by Shabinaa Entertainment and 
Alligator Media Productions. The series stars Prateik Babbar, Sonal Chauhan, Jisshu Sengupta, and Denzil Smith in lead role. It premiered on 22 May 2019, and the show is available on ZEE5.

Cast
 Prateik Babbar as Chandrashekhar 
 Sonal Chauhan as Meenakshi Pirzada
 Jishu Sengupta as Harshvardhan Dharma
 Jatin Goswami as Sayyed Ali Hassan
 Amit Kumar as Sandeep Beniwal 

 Denzil Smith as Nalini Ranjan Pant

Release

The series was released on 22 May 2019, and it is available on ZEE5.

Episodes

References

External links
 
Skyfire on ZEE5

2019 Indian television series debuts
Indian science fiction television series